Gordon Stanley Reid  (22 September 1923 – 26 October 1989) was an Australian academic who served as the 26th Governor of Western Australia. Born in Hurstville, a suburb of Sydney, New South Wales, he was educated at Hurstville Boys High School before enlisting in the Royal Australian Air Force, where he served as a flying officer during the Second World War. After the conclusion of the war, Reid studied at the London School of Economics in England, later winning a scholarship to Nuffield College at the University of Oxford. Having obtained his Doctorate of Philosophy, Reid lectured at the University of Adelaide before serving as the vice-chancellor of the University of Western Australia from 1978 to 1982. Appointed governor in 1984, he served in the position until 1989, resigning a month before his death from cancer.

Early life and education
Reid was educated at Hurstville Boys High School in New South Wales from 1934 to 1937, then enlisted in the Royal Australian Air Force in 1942, reaching the rank of Flying Officer by the time of his discharge in 1946. He met and married his wife, Ruth, in Brighton, England while stationed at RAF Gamston. In his civilian career Reid worked as a reading clerk, accountant and clerk of papers. He was clerk of records for the Australian House of Representatives from 1952 to 1955, and was Serjeant-at-Arms at Parliament House, Canberra while studying for his Commerce degree. He then travelled to England where he obtained his master's degree and his Doctor of Philosophy degree at the London School of Economics. He won a Nuffield Scholarship.

Academic and governor
Prior to serving as governor in 1984, Professor Reid lectured at Adelaide University and served at the University of Western Australia as Vice-Chancellor (1978–82) and Professor of Politics (1966–70, 1974–78, 1983–84). He was the author and joint author of various books and publications on Australian politics including:

 The politics of financial control (1966)
 Out of the wilderness: the return of Labor (1974)
 The Western Australian elections (1974)
 The premiers of Western Australia, 1890–1982 (1982)

As part of the Australian parliament's bicentenary publications project, Reid, assisted by Martin Forrest, was commissioned to write a history of the parliament.

In 1986, Reid was appointed a Companion of the Order of Australia (AC).

On 20 August 1989, the Premier, Peter Dowding, announced that Reid had been undergoing extensive surgery for cancer, and would be stepping down as governor. He died shortly after, on 26 October.

References

External links
 Papers of Professor Gordon Stanley Reid ( –1989), National Library of Australia
 The Reid Oration to honour Professor Reid's contribution to public life.

Further reading
 Spillman, Ken (Ed.): A Gentle Man. Memories of Professor Gordon Reid 1923–1989. (1990) 

1923 births
1989 deaths
Alumni of Nuffield College, Oxford
Alumni of the London School of Economics
Academic staff of the Australian National University
Australian political scientists
Deaths from cancer in Western Australia
Companions of the Order of Australia
Governors of Western Australia
People from Sydney
Royal Australian Air Force officers
Academic staff of the University of Adelaide
Academic staff of the University of Western Australia
Royal Australian Air Force personnel of World War II
20th-century political scientists